Cupeño may refer to:
the Cupeño people
the Cupeño language
Cupeño traditional narratives